Sofija Veiverytė (April 13, 1926 in Naujatriobiai, Kaunas district – July 23, 2009 in Vilnius) was a Lithuanian artist. She studied monumental painting at the Kaunas Applied and Decorative Arts Institute. From 1951 to 1985 she lectured at the Lithuanian Art Institute. Her works are monumental and expressive.

Publications 
 Monographs, 1976 and 1968
 Exhibition catalogues, Vilnius 1981 and Bulgaria 1986
 Book of reproductions of her paintings, 1987

Honours and awards 

People's Artist of Lithuania
Honoured Art Worker (1974)
Painter of the Nation (1976)
Lithuania Prize (1976)
Laureate of Baltic Countries (1981)
Exhibition Silver Medal, Moscow (1981)
Grand Prix for portrait, Yugoslavia Biennale (1984)
Order of Friendship of Peoples (1986)
Order of the Lithuanian Grand Duke Gediminas (1996)
Estonian Order of the White Star, Fifth Class (2004) 
1st prize in paintings exhibition in Lithuania (2006)

References 

1926 births
2009 deaths
20th-century Lithuanian women artists
21st-century Lithuanian women artists
People from Kaunas District Municipality
Academic staff of the Vilnius Academy of Arts
Recipients of the Order of the Lithuanian Grand Duke Gediminas
Lithuanian portrait painters